Strictispira paxillus is a species of small sea snail, a marine gastropod mollusk in the family Pseudomelatomidae.

Description
The length of the shell varies between 8 mm and 18 mm.

The chocolate-brown shell is short and stout. The spire is acuminated at the apex. The whorls are concave round the top, with a small keel, very closely plicated in the middle. The interstices between the folds are finely striated. The shell is ridged round the base. The sinus is large.

Distribution
S. paxillus can be found in Caribbean waters, ranging from the Bahamas south to Brazil.

References

External links
 De Jong K.M. & Coomans H.E. (1988) Marine gastropods from Curaçao, Aruba and Bonaire. Leiden: E.J. Brill. 261 pp. 
 MNHN, Paris: specimen
 
 Gastropods.com: Strictispira paxillus

paxillus
Gastropods described in 1845